Hope Elise Ross Lange (November 28, 1933 – December 19, 2003) was an American film, stage, and television actress. She was nominated for the Golden Globe Award for Best Supporting Actress and the Academy Award for Best Supporting Actress for her portrayal of Selena Cross in the 1957 film Peyton Place. In 1969 and 1970, she won the Primetime Emmy Award for Outstanding Lead Actress in a Comedy Series for her role as Carolyn Muir in the sitcom The Ghost & Mrs. Muir.

Early life

Lange was born into a theatrical family in Redding, Connecticut. Her father, John George Lange, was a cellist and the music arranger for Florenz Ziegfeld and conductor for Henry Cohen; her mother, Minette (née Buddecke), was an actress. They had two other daughters, Minelda and Joy, and a son, David. John worked in New York City and the family moved to Greenwich Village when Hope was a young child.

Lange sang with other children in the play Life, Laughter and Tears, which opened at the Booth Theatre in March 1942. Her father died in September 1942. The family stayed in New York City after his death. At age 9, she had a speaking part in the award-winning Broadway play The Patriots, which opened in January 1943. From 1944 to 1956 Minette ran a restaurant on Macdougal Street, near Washington Square Park, called Minette's of Washington Square. (Some sources confuse it with Minetta Tavern, an Italian restaurant on Macdougal Street, founded in 1937.) The entire family worked there; Minelda ran the cash register, and Joy and Hope waited on tables.

In high school, Lange studied dance, modeled, and worked in the family restaurant. She sometimes walked the dog of former First Lady Eleanor Roosevelt, who had a nearby apartment. When her photo appeared in the newspaper, she received an offer to work as a New York City advertising model. She appeared on the June 1949 cover of Radio-Electronics magazine wearing the "Man from Mars" Radio Hat. This portable radio built into a pith helmet was a sensation in 1949.

Lange attended Reed College in Portland, Oregon for one year, studying dance and theater before subsequently transferring to Barmore Junior College in New York, where she met her first husband, Don Murray.

Career
Lange began working in television in the 1950s with appearances on Kraft Television Theatre. She was seen by a Hollywood producer and contracted to 20th Century Fox. She came to prominence in her first film role in Bus Stop with Marilyn Monroe and Don Murray, whom she married on April 14, 1956. Murray later said that Monroe grew jealous of another blonde being hired for the movie and asked the producers to dye Lange's blonde hair light brown.

After favorable reviews, Lange landed a major role in the then-risqué 1957 film Peyton Place. Her strong performance earned her a nomination for a Golden Globe Award and another for the Academy Award for Best Supporting Actress. She subsequently became well-known for such supporting ingénue roles, and said that the resulting typecasting shortened her movie career.

She went on to appear in Nicholas Ray's film The True Story of Jesse James (1957) as James' wife, opposite Robert Wagner; and in The Young Lions with Montgomery Clift. She starred as the wife of Jeffrey Hunter's character in Anton Myrer's wartime drama In Love and War (1958). These roles led to her earning top billing in The Best of Everything (1959), with Suzy Parker and Joan Crawford.

Lange appeared as Elvis Presley's older psychologist love interest in Wild in the Country (1961), despite being only 13 months Elvis' senior. She then appeared in Frank Capra's final movie, Pocketful of Miracles, with Glenn Ford. The next year, she appeared with Ford again in the romantic comedy Love Is a Ball.

Lange returned to television for a 1966 role on the series The Fugitive (1963). She starred from 1968 to 1970 on the television series, The Ghost & Mrs. Muir for which she earned two Emmy Awards. and a Golden Globe Award nomination. This success was followed by three seasons on The New Dick Van Dyke Show as Dick Van Dyke's wife, Jenny Preston, from 1971 to 1974, after which she declined to return for a fourth season of the show. She also appeared in twelve television movies, one being Crowhaven Farm where she played the role of a witch. In 1977, she returned to the Broadway stage where her acting career had originally begun. She also played the murdered wife of Charles Bronson's vigilante character in Death Wish (1974). In 1985, she appeared in A Nightmare on Elm Street 2: Freddy's Revenge, and in 1986, she took a role as Laura Dern's mother in David Lynch's Blue Velvet. She took a Broadway role in Same Time, Next Year and then made appearances in the television movie based on Danielle Steel's Message from Nam and in Clear and Present Danger (1994).

Lange made appearances in the Maine town in which Peyton Place had been filmed during the film's 40th anniversary celebrations in 1998.

Personal life

Date of birth
Lange's year of birth is often reported as 1931, but the correct year is 1933. A possible source of this error is the Reader's Digest Almanac and Yearbook. It has shown the 1931 date from as early as 1980 to the 2009 issue. The 1976 and earlier editions give the year of birth as 1933. Other references such as Chase's Annual Events have always shown 1933, as does her Social Security Death Index entry.

The 1933 year also matches the ages given in newspaper accounts of Lange in her youth. The New York Times covered the annual "Young People's Concert" awards given at Carnegie Hall. Lange received an award in April 1945 and again in April 1946, when her age was given as 12. Lange's age of 12 in April 1946 would correspond to a birthdate in November 1933, not 1931.

Also, a short feature story was published in February 1951 about Hope Lange's culinary skills. The first paragraph gives the biography of a 17-year-old Hope Lange of Greenwich Village, New York. Her late father was "director of music for Florenz Ziegfield [sic]" and her mother had a catering business. In addition to modeling, acting, and dancing, Hope could make "terrific" sandwiches. The article gives her recipes for "Sardine Strips" and "Cheese Ribbon" sandwiches. Born in 1933, Lange would have been 17 years old in February 1951.

Relationships
Lange's first marriage was to actor Don Murray, whom she met while filming his breakout role in Bus Stop with Marilyn Monroe in 1956; they had two children, actor Christopher Murray and photographer Patricia Murray. Lange left Don Murray in 1961 for actor Glenn Ford, associate producer and co-star of Pocketful of Miracles. They had a four year relationship. She and Ford never married. She then left acting for three years after her October 19, 1963, marriage to producer-director Alan J. Pakula, whom she divorced in 1971. 

In 1972, she also dated Frank Sinatra and began a relationship with married novelist John Cheever. In 1986, she married theatrical producer Charles Hollerith, Jr. (1927–2011), with whom she remained for the rest of her life.

Death
Lange died on December 19, 2003 at St. John's Hospital in Santa Monica, California, as a result of an ischemic colitis infection at the age of 70. Her body was cremated.

Filmography

Film

Television

Awards and nominations

References

External links

 
 
 
 

1933 births
2003 deaths
20th-century American actresses
Actresses from New York City
American child actresses
Female models from Connecticut
American film actresses
American stage actresses
American television actresses
Outstanding Performance by a Lead Actress in a Comedy Series Primetime Emmy Award winners
Infectious disease deaths in California
Reed College alumni
People from Redding, Connecticut
20th Century Studios contract players